In mathematics, the Jordan–Pólya numbers are the numbers that can be obtained by multiplying together one or more factorials, not required to be distinct from each other. For instance,  is a Jordan–Pólya number because  Every tree has a number of symmetries that is a Jordan–Pólya number, and every Jordan–Pólya number arises in this way as the order of an automorphism group of a tree. These numbers are named after Camille Jordan and George Pólya, who both wrote about them in the context of symmetries of trees.

These numbers grow more quickly than polynomials but more slowly than exponentials. As well as in the symmetries of trees, they arise as the numbers of transitive orientations of comparability graphs and in the problem of finding factorials that can be represented as products of smaller factorials.

Sequence and growth rate
The sequence of Jordan–Pólya numbers begins:

They form the smallest multiplicatively closed set containing all of the factorials.

More precisely, for every , and every sufficiently large  (depending on ), the number  of Jordan–Pólya numbers up to  obeys the inequalities

Factorials that are products of smaller factorials
Every Jordan–Pólya number , except 2, has the property that its factorial  can be written as a product of smaller factorials. This can be done simply by expanding  and then replacing  in this product by its representation as a product of factorials.

References

Integer sequences
Factorial and binomial topics
Algebraic graph theory
Trees (graph theory)